Mila Guy (born 14 November 1992), is a South African actress and costume designer. She is best known for her role as  "Malanie Schmit" in the kykNet television series Hotel and her critically acclaimed role as "Nonnie Blignout" in the film Liewe Kersfeesvader.

Personal life
Mila was born on 14 November 1992 in Nelspruit in Mpumalanga, South Africa. When she was in Standard 8, she emigrated to New Zealand with her family. Her first year of tertiary education was completed at the University of Auckland. After returned to South Africa, she graduated with her BA degree in Drama at the University of Pretoria in 2014.

Career
In 2014, she made television debut during the 10th season of the kykNET soap opera Binnelanders, where she played the role of "Zanel Jordaan". In 2015, she made the film debut with Ballade vir 'n Enkeling. Then she acted in several short films and feature films such as; For the Birds, Wonderlus, Vuil Wasgoed, Desember, Stille Nag, Soek jy 'n Lift and Parable. In 2016, she was cast in the kykNET mockumentary comedy series Hotel, where she played the role "Malanie Schmit" in all seasons as a series regular. In the same year, she made a item song appearance in the kykNET musical drama series Sterlopers and a guest role in the SABC1 legal drama serial Sokhulu & Partners.

In 2017, she acted in the film Liewe Kersfeesvader directed by Etienne Fourie. In the film she played the role "Nonnie Blignout", where she was nominated for the Silwerskerm Festival Prize for Best Actress at the Silwerskerm Festival. In the same year, she joined with recurring cast as "Kara" in the kyKNET sitcom Phil101, as "Antoinette de Villiers" in the SABC1 comedy-drama Bedford Wives, as "Mia" on the SABC2 drama series Erfsondes, as "Benina" in the SABC2 telenovela Keeping Score and in 2019 as "Vicky" in the kykNET drama series Alles Malan.

In 2019, she made the titular role in the short film Miemie. The film later received an official selection at the 2019 Silwerskermfees. In April 2020, she made the debut appearance for the popular SABC2 soap opera 7de Laan, where she played the role of "Lana Basson". Quickly after that, she made a recurring role as "Karien Koelenberg" in a parody segment in the comedy show Die Laager. In 2020, she joined with the kykNET comedy-drama series Ekstra Medium by playing the role "Elke".

Filmography

References

External links 
 IMDb

Living people
South African film actresses
1992 births
South African television actresses